Marytown may refer to:

 Marytown, Wisconsin, United States; an unincorporated community in Fond du Lac County
 Marytown, West Virginia, United States; an unincorporated community in McDowell County
 Marytown, Libertyville, Illinois, United States; a Conventual Franciscan Friar Community for Saint Maximilian Kolbe
 Máriaváros District (Marytown District), Kecskemét, Bács-Kiskun, Hungary

See also

 
 Marystown (disambiguation)
 Maryton (disambiguation)